Hkampti is a small village in Hkamti Township in Hkamti District in the Sagaing Region of northwestern Burma.

Climate

Hkampti has a humid subtropical climate (Köppen climate classification Cwa) bordering on a tropical monsoon climate (Köppen climate classification Am). Temperatures are very warm throughout the year, although the winter months (December-February) are milder. There is a winter dry season (November-March) and a summer wet season (April-October). Torrential rain falls from June to September, with over  falling in July alone.

References

External links
Maplandia World Gazetteer

Populated places in Hkamti District
Hkamti Township